Arthur Kipps is the name of the protagonist in two distinct works of fiction.

HG Wells character
The main character in HG Wells novel Kipps
The same character in derivative works:
Kipps (1921 film), starring George K. Arthur in the role
Kipps (1941 film), starring Michael Redgrave in the role
Half a Sixpence, a musical comedy starring Tommy Steele
Half a Sixpence (film), a film version of the musical, also starring Tommy Steele

Susan Hill character
The main character in the Susan Hill novel The Woman in Black
The same character in derivative works:
The Woman in Black (play), a 1987 stage play
The Woman in Black (1989 film), a television film
The Woman in Black (2012 film), a cinematic release film, starring Daniel Radcliffe